The Third Oklahoma Legislature was a meeting of the legislative branch of the government of Oklahoma, composed of the Oklahoma Senate and the Oklahoma House of Representatives. The state legislature met in the Levy Building in Oklahoma City, beginning with a special session from November 28 to December 16, 1910, during the end of Governor Charles Haskell's term and ending with a regular session from January 3 to March 11, 1911, during the first year of the term of Governor Lee Cruce. The Democratic Party, which already held the majority of seats in the Oklahoma House of Representatives, further increased the number of seats they held after the 1910 election.

Lieutenant Governor J. J. McAlester served as the President of the Senate and Elmer Thomas served as the President pro tempore of the Oklahoma Senate. W. B. Anthony served as Speaker of the Oklahoma House of Representatives during the special session in 1910, while William A. Durant took over during the regular session in 1911.

Dates of sessions
Special session: November 28, 2010 – December 16, 1910
Regular session: January 3-March 11, 1911
Previous: 2nd Legislature • Next: 4th Legislature

Party composition

Senate

House of Representatives

Leadership

Senate
Lieutenant Governor J. J. McAlester served as the President of the Senate, which gave him a tie-breaking vote and allowed him to serve as a presiding officer. Elmer Thomas was elected by state senators to serve as the President pro tempore of the Oklahoma Senate, the primary presiding officer of the Oklahoma Senate.

House
The Democratic caucus held the majority of seats in the Oklahoma House of Representatives. W.B. Anthony, of Marlow, served as Speaker of the Oklahoma House of Representatives during the special session in 1910, and William A. Durant served as Speaker of the Oklahoma House of Representatives during the regular session in 1911.

Members

Senate

Table based on 2005 Oklahoma Almanac.

House of Representatives

Table based on government database.

References

External links
Oklahoma Legislature
Oklahoma House of Representatives
Oklahoma Senate

Oklahoma legislative sessions
1911 in Oklahoma
1912 in Oklahoma
1911 U.S. legislative sessions
1912 U.S. legislative sessions